Grigore C. Crăiniceanu (9 July 1852, Bucharest – 1 October 1935) was a Romanian military officer.

He participated in the Romanian War of Independence. From 1904 to 1907, he was inspector general of military engineers. From 1907 to 1909, Crăiniceanu was Chief of the Romanian General Staff. In 1909, he was promoted to divisional general. From November 1909 to December 1910, he served as War Minister in the cabinet of Ion I. C. Brătianu. In 1911, he was elected a titular member of the Romanian Academy. 

From 1911 to 1913, he commanded the Second Army Corps. Sent into reserve in 1913, he was recalled to active duty upon Romania's entry into World War I, commanding the Second Army during the Battle of Transylvania, from August 25 to September 25, 1916. Then, from 1916 to 1917, Crăiniceanu was inspector general of the army. His son, Lieutenant colonel , was allegedly recruited by the German secret service while he was the Romanian military attaché in Vienna (1914–1916) and was executed for treason in April 1917 after he had attempted desertion to the Germans, as part of a plot masterminded by Colonel , the son of the former prime minister Dimitrie Sturdza.  

Crăiniceanu founded two magazines, Revista Armatei and Cercul publicațiilor militare.

Notes

1852 births
1935 deaths
Military personnel from Bucharest
People of the Principality of Wallachia
Romanian Ministers of Defence
Chiefs of the General Staff of Romania
Romanian Land Forces generals
Titular members of the Romanian Academy
Romanian magazine founders
Romanian military personnel of the Russo-Turkish War (1877–1878)
Romanian Army World War I generals

ro:Grigore Crăiniceanu